Valentia is a historic home located at Hagerstown, Washington County, Maryland, United States. It is a large -story L-shaped stone farmhouse, facing south overlooking Antietam Creek.  The house features a flat-roofed, one-story porch covers the south door and flanking windows and is supported by four Doric columns resting on stone piers.  Also on the property is a small tenant house and Miller's House, constructed of the same stone as the main house.

It was listed on the National Register of Historic Places in 1974.

References

External links
, including undated photo, at Maryland Historical Trust

Houses on the National Register of Historic Places in Maryland
Houses in Hagerstown, Maryland
National Register of Historic Places in Washington County, Maryland